BI, Bi or bi may refer to:

Prefix
 Bi-, a number prefix denoting two, as in:
 Air Sylphe Bi 582, a two-seat French powered parachute design
 Bisexuality, or "bi", a sexual orientation for more than one gender

Places
 Barrie—Innisfil, a Canadian electoral district
 Burundi, by World Meteorological Organization and ISO 3166-1 country code

People
 Bi (Rain), or Rain (born 1982), South Korean singer
 B.I (rapper) (born Kim Han-bin, 1996), South Korean rapper, singer-songwriter and record producer
 Bi (surname) (畢/毕), a Chinese surname
 Brandon Ingram, commonly referred to as BI, professional basketball player

Arts, entertainment, and media
 Bi (Astyplaz album), 2008
 Bi (Kevin Johansen album), 2012
 "Bi" (song), a 1993 song by Living Colour
 "B.I.: Bartificial Intelligence", a segment from the cartoon The Simpsons
 Business Insider, or BI, a publication

Businesses and organizations

Education
 BI Norwegian Business School
 Bishop Ireton High School, a Roman Catholic high school in Alexandria, Virginia, US

Transportation
 "B.I", several aircraft of the name, see List of B1 aircraft
 Braniff International Airways, a former airline
 British-India Steam Navigation Company, former ship owner and ship operator
 Royal Brunei Airlines, by IATA airline code
 Bereznyak-Isayev BI-1, a Soviet short-range rocket powered interceptor developed during the Second World War.

Other businesses and organizations
 Bank of Indonesia, the central bank of Indonesia
 Batteries Included (company), a former computer company based in Canada
 Berggruen Institute, Los Angeles-based think tank 
 Boehringer Ingelheim, a pharmaceutical firm
 Bohemia Interactive, a developer and publisher of video games
 British Invisibles, a former UK company rebranded BI

Identity cards
 Bilhete de identidade (Mozambique)
 Bilhete de Identidade (Portugal)

Science and technology

Computing
 .bi, the Internet top-level domain for Burundi
 Breidbart Index, a measure of the severity of Usenet newsgroup spam
 Business informatics, the combined discipline of information technology and management
 Business intelligence, in information technology, the discipline of dealing and analysing business-related information
 Microsoft Power BI, software for business analytics

Other uses in science and technology
 Biot number (Bi), a dimensionless quantity in physics
 Bismuth, symbol Bi, a chemical element

Other uses
 Bi (cuneiform), a cuneiform sign and syllable
 Bi (jade), a type of jade disk produced in ancient China
 Bislama language (ISO 639 alpha-2 language code BI)
Brain damage, brain injury, from different causes
 Burning Index, quantifying the effort needed to contain a fire
 Business interruption (BI), a concept in business interruption insurance
 Indonesian language, or Bahasa Indonesia

See also
 Ы, Yery or Yeru, a letter in the Cyrillic script
 B1 (disambiguation)
 Bilhete de identidade (disambiguation)
 Bipolar (disambiguation)
 Bismuth (disambiguation)